Cnemaspis auriventralis, the Erawan rock gecko, is a species of diurnal, rock-dwelling, insectivorous gecko endemic to  Thailand.

References

 Cnemaspis auriventralis

auriventralis
Reptiles of Thailand
Reptiles described in 2022
Endemic fauna of Thailand